The Whitehorse City Council is the governing body of the city of Whitehorse, Yukon, Canada. The council consists of a mayor plus six councillors elected at large. The current mayor of Whitehorse is Dan Curtis, since 2012.

Governance of the city was temporarily transferred to a taxpayer advisory committee led by Joseph Oliver for part of 1973, after five of the city's six councillors resigned on July 9, 1973 in protest against a jurisdictional dispute with the Yukon Territorial Council, leaving the council without a quorum to conduct city business. A by-election was held on September 20, 1973 to elect a new council.

Council composition

2021-2024 City Council

2018-2021 City Council

References

External links
 City of Whitehorse

Municipal councils in Canada
Politics of Whitehorse